Akanye or akanje, literally "a-ing", is a sound change in Slavic languages in which the phonemes  or  are realized as more or less close to . It is a case of vowel reduction. 

The most familiar example is probably Russian akanye (pronounced but not represented orthographically in the standard language). Akanye also occurs in:
 Standard Belarusian (represented orthographically)
 Northern (Polissian) Ukrainian dialects
 Slovene dialects (e.g., Lower Carniolan dialects), 
 Some subgroups of the Kajkavian dialect of Serbo-Croatian
 Bulgarian dialects (e.g., the Rhodope dialects, including the Smolyan dialect).

Description 

In Russian а́канье (akan'ye), (except for Northern dialects),  and  phonetically merge in unstressed positions. If not preceded by a palatalized (soft) consonant, these phonemes give  (sometimes also transcribed as ) in the syllable immediately before the stress and in absolute word-initial position. The dialects without reduction of unstressed o are called okanye, literally "o-ing".
Unlike Belarusian akanne, Russian akanye does not affect softened vowels.

Slovene akanje may be partial (affecting only syllables before or after the stressed vowel) or complete (affecting all vowels in a word). Examples from various Slovene dialects: domú → damú 'at home' (pretonic o), dnò → dnà 'bottom' (tonic o), léto → líəta (posttonic o), ne vém → na vém 'I don't know' (pretonic e), hléb → hlàb 'loaf' (tonic e), jêčmen → jèčman 'barley' (posttonic e).

See also
 Vowel reduction in Russian – about ikanye.

Notes

Sources
 
 

Phonology
Slavic phonologies